Tax law or revenue law is an area of legal study in which public or sanctioned authorities, such as federal, state and municipal governments (as in the case of the US) use a body of rules and procedures (laws) to assess and collect taxes in a legal context. The rates and merits of the various taxes, imposed by the authorities, are attained via the political process inherent in these bodies of power, and not directly attributable to the actual domain of tax law itself.

Tax law is part of public law. It covers the application of existing tax laws on individuals, entities and corporations, in areas where tax revenue is derived or levied, e.g. income tax, estate tax, business tax, employment/payroll tax, property tax, gift tax and exports/imports tax. There have been some arguments that consumer law is a better way to engage in large-scale redistribution than tax law because it does not necessitate legislation and can be more efficient, given the complexities of tax law.

Major issues
Primary taxation issues differ among various countries, although similarities might exist.

Developed Countries 
 Taxes can fail to raise sufficient revenue to cover government spending.
 Taxes are generally complex and can be viewed as benefitting high income earners more than they do to lower income earners (in the payment of relatively less tax).
 Tax evasion and avoidance occur, leading to reduced government revenue.
 Taxes can produce poor desired outcomes (lower productivity and provide less incentive for businesses to grow).
 Taxes can curb economic growth through inefficiency, e.g. corporate taxes/hurdles that could impede smaller entities to grow.
 Taxation can be viewed as disproportionate, as in the case of the taxation of capital gains versus labor income, in which investors generally pay less tax on investment income vs workers who proportionally pay more on their wages.
 Taxes can remain questionable in achieving desired goals, such the Ecotax which is primarily intended to promote environmentally friendly activities via economic incentives.

Developing Countries 
 Taxes in developing economies can be hard to standardize since most workers work in small, and often unregulated enterprises.
 Tax systems without sound establishments and competent administration to run and manage them can be burdensome and inefficient.
 Tax systems without reliable data are hard to regulate and change.
 Tax systems tend to have the rich bear a heavier burden of taxation.

Education

Australia
Tax law education is a specialisation of accountants, tax agents, and lawyers. Accountants are required by either CPA Australia to complete a course in law of taxation and law of financial services. There is a legal obligation to complete taxation law and commercial law for registration as a tax agent with the Tax Practitioner's Board. Law students are not typically required to complete a unit in tax law, but may opt to take it as an elective in Australian universities.

Pertaining to the US

Pre-requisites 
 completion of a bachelor's degree - students contemplating tax law might have to consider majoring in economics, accounting or finance.
 sitting for Law School Admission Test (LSAT).

Law School 
 in law school, the students take foundational courses from "constitutional law to civil procedures."
 at this level, law students can take more specialized courses in taxation, such as "limited partnerships and income taxes, business liquidations and acquisitions."
 Upon completion, the law students graduate with a Juris Doctor (J.D.) degree—which is sufficient for admission to an LL.M. in Taxation.

Post Law School 
 JD graduates may then enroll in a Master of Laws in Taxation (LL.M.), a one-year program. Other concentrations available to students include: estate planning or business taxation.
 The Bar exam.

Pertaining to other countries

Post Law School 
 JD graduates enroll in a Master of Laws (LL.M) program, as is seen in Canada, United Kingdom, Australia, and the Netherlands.

General Requirements
 A bachelor's degree - required for entry into law school.
 Law School Admission Test (LSAT) - Required for law school admission in United States, Canada and a growing number of countries. J.D. (Juris Doctor) or First degree in law.
 The Juris Doctor (JD) program is offered by only a number of countries. These include: United States, Australia, Canada, Hong Kong (China), Japan, Philippines, Singapore and the United Kingdom. The courses vary in duration of years, curriculum and whether or not further training is required, depending on which country the program is in.

In Africa 
Most African countries use the British legal education curriculum in their law educational system to train lawyers.

Overall, legal education, across African countries, starts at the university level as an undergraduate course although a few universities have promulgated a law degree as a graduate program "akin to [that] … in the United States, Canada, and India."

In most African countries, a law degree does not necessarily qualify one to practice as a lawyer. Further post-graduate practical training is required.

Graduates earn an undergraduate law degree, viz. the Bachelor of Laws (LL.B.), via a four-year program (as in Malawi, Kenya, Zambia, and most of South African law universities). Subsequently, graduates with the Bachelor of Laws seek to earn the Master of Laws or greater in order to become practitioners of the law. Some law institutions offer tracks to a Master of Philosophy (M.Phil.), a Doctor of Philosophy degree (Ph.D.), or a Doctor of Laws degree (LL.D.) with emphasis on tax law.

A list of tax faculty ranked by publication downloads is maintained by Paul Caron at TaxProf Blog.

Taxation by jurisdiction

Africa
 Taxation in South Africa
 Taxation in Tanzania

Americas
 Taxation in Argentina
 Taxation in Canada
 Taxation in Colombia
 Taxation in the British Virgin Islands
 Taxation in Peru
 Taxation in the United States

Asia
 Taxation in China (*Taxation in the People's Republic of China)
 Taxation in India
 Taxation in Iran
 Taxation in the Palestinian territories

Europe
 Taxation in the European Union
 Taxation in Azerbaijan
 Taxation in Bulgaria
 Taxation in France
 Taxation in Germany
 Taxation in the Republic of Ireland
 Taxation in the Netherlands
 Taxation in Poland
 Taxation in Portugal
 Taxation in Russia
 Taxes in Spain
 Taxation in the United Kingdom

Oceania
 Taxation in Australia
 Taxation in New Zealand

See also 
 Corporate law
 Corporate tax

References 

 
Public law
Taxation-related lists